= Dhatau =

Dhatav M.I.D.C.
- city
- Location in Maharashtra, India
- Coordinates: 18.4208°N 73.1577°E
- Country: India
- State: Maharashtra
- District: Raigad

Government
  - Body: Grampanchayat

Population (2011)
  - Total: 6,000

Languages
  - Official: Marathi
- Time zone: UTC+5:30 (IST)
- Postal code: 402116

Dhatav is a Village in Roha Taluka in Raigad district in the state of Maharashtra, India. Dhatav connected through Mumbai & Pune through Mumbai Goa Highway in kolad

== Demographics ==
As of 2001 India census, Dhatau had a population of 5035. Males constitute 56% of the population and females 44%. Dhatau has an average literacy rate of 72%, higher than the national average of 59.5%: male literacy is 78% and, female literacy is 65%. In Dhatau, 14% of the population is under 6 years of age.
